The 12th Parliament of Singapore was a meeting of the Parliament of Singapore. The first session commenced on 10 October 2011 and was prorogued on 25 August 2015. The membership was set by the 2011 Singapore General Election on 7 May 2011 and changed three times due to expulsion of Hougang Single Member Constituency MP in 2012 and resignation of Punggol East Single Member Constituency MP and Speaker of Parliament over extra-marital affairs in 2013, as well as the death of Lee Kuan Yew, former Prime Minister of Singapore and MP of Tanjong Pagar Group Representation Constituency.

The 12th Parliament was controlled by a People's Action Party majority, led by Prime Minister Lee Hsien Loong and members of the cabinet, which assumed power on 7 May 2011. The Opposition was led by the Secretary General of the Worker's Party of Singapore, Mr Low Thia Khiang. The Speaker of the Parliament of Singapore was Halimah Yacob, of the People's Action Party. She was elected as the 9th Speaker of the House for the 12th Parliament on 14 January 2013.

Result of the 2011 Singaporean general election

The Workers' Party and the Singapore People's Party, being the best performing opposition parties were awarded 2 and 1 Non-Constituency Member of Parliament Seat respectively in accordance with the Constitution. The NCMP Seats were held by Gerald Giam Yean Song and Yee Jenn Jong of the Workers' Party and Lina Chiam of Singapore People's Party.

Officeholders

Speakers 
Michael Palmer (the People's Action Party MP for Punggol East SMC) was elected Speaker of the Parliament on October 10, 2011. He resigned on 14 December 2012, due to an extramarital affair.
Charles Chong of the People's Action Party, MP of Joo Chiat SMC was designated as Acting Speaker of the Parliament on 14 December 2012, by Prime Minister Lee Hsien Loong. He was succeeded by Halimah Yacob on 14 January 2013.
Halimah Yacob of the People's Action Party, MP of Jurong GRC was elected Speaker of Parliament on 14 January 2013.
Charles Chong and Seah Kian Peng of the People's Action Party are elected Deputy Speaker of the parliament on 17 October 2011.

Leaders
Prime Minister of Singapore: Lee Hsien Loong (People's Action Party)
Leader of the Opposition: Low Thia Khiang (Worker's Party)

House Leaders
Leader of the House: Dr Ng Eng Hen
Deputy Leader of the House: Heng Chee How

Whips
Government Whip: Gan Kim Yong
Deputy Government Whip: Dr. Teo Ho Pin and Dr. Amy Khor

Members

Notes

References

Parliament of Singapore